KD Maharaja Lela is the lead ship of Maharaja Lela-class frigate built locally by Boustead Heavy Industries Corporation (BHIC) based on Naval Group's Gowind-class design. She is named after Maharaja Lela, in honour of the Perak chieftain and British colonialism resistance leader, Dato Maharaja Lela.

Development
Under a contract valued of RM9 billion, BHIC was contracted to built a total of six class of this ship for RMN. Each of the ships are equipped with warfare capabilities for electronic, air, surface and underwater threats, integrated with state-of-the-art systems. Maharaja Lela was launched on 24 August 2017 by Queen of Perak, Tuanku Zara Salim, witnessed by Sultan of Perak Sultan Nazrin Muizzuddin Shah at the BHIC Shipyard in Lumut, Perak.

References

Maharaja Lela